David John Corbett (1 February 1910 – 1995) was a Scottish professional footballer who played as a right half.

Career
Born in Camelon, Corbett played for Old Plean Amateurs, Linlithgow Rose, Heart of Midlothian, Camelon Juniors, Ayr United, Dundee United, West Ham United, Southport, Dumbarton and St Mirren.

Corbett joined Dundee United on trial at the beginning of the 1933–34 season, playing the first two matches as a trialist prior to signing for the club. He went to feature as an ever-present for United up until suffering a serious injury in November 1935, although he returned to the side two months later. Despite the club retaining his registration in the close season of 1936, he didn't appear in the United team again and was transferred to West Ham that October. He would later return to Dundee United for one Southern League match in October 1945.

Personal life
Corbett had two younger brothers who were both professional footballers – Norman and Willie.

References

1910 births
1995 deaths
Scottish footballers
Linlithgow Rose F.C. players
Heart of Midlothian F.C. players
Scottish Junior Football Association players
Camelon Juniors F.C. players
Ayr United F.C. players
Dundee United F.C. players
West Ham United F.C. players
Southport F.C. players
Dumbarton F.C. players
St Mirren F.C. players
Scottish Football League players
English Football League players
Association football wing halves
Footballers from Falkirk